Our Lady of Good Counsel Catholic Church is a parish of the Roman Catholic Church of Hawaii in the United States.  Located in Pearl City on the island of Oahu, the church falls under the jurisdiction of the Diocese of Honolulu and its bishop.

References

External links
 Parish Website
 Youth and Young Adult Ministries

Roman Catholic Diocese of Honolulu
Roman Catholic churches in Hawaii
Religious buildings and structures in Honolulu County, Hawaii